Batu Lintang National Secondary School (abbreviation SMKBL) is a public secondary school located in Jalan College, Batu Lintang, Kuching, Sarawak, Malaysia.

History
Batu Lintang National Secondary School, Kuching started public service as a government school in 1977 with 13 teachers and 320 students in its opening year. During that year, there were only two class forms: Transition and Form 1. Two years later, the school was resituated at a temporary building in Jalan College. Currently, the aforementioned temporary building is in active use as a school for the blind, SMK Pendidikan Khas. Forms 2 and 3 had already been introduced by this time, supporting its students up till the PMR mass examinations.

In 1982, Batu Lintang National Secondary School offered Form 4 classes. By the following year, SPM examinations were held there for Form 5 students. Similarly, in the year 1988 and 1989, Lower Form 6 classes and STPM exams were offered, respectively. However, the classes and exams at this level were limited to the Literature stream; the Science stream classes were only available by the year 2003.

The Special Education Integrated Programme (Vision Impaired) was introduced in the school's system in 1986, allowing visually-impaired students (or resource students) to study in the least restrictive environment possible. As such, resource rooms containing Braille typewriters and dedicated teaching materials are provided to these students. The programme is currently active in this school's system.

As of 2012, there were 127 teachers, 17 non-teaching staff and 1591 students taking part in the various academic and co-curricular activities under the school's banner. By percentage, 54.81% of the students were Chinese, 43.68% were Bumiputera, 1.01% were Indian and the remaining 0.50% were of other ethnicities.

List of Principals
 1977-1978 : Mr. Martin Chai
 1978-1981 : Mr. Wong Sze Yong
 1981-1984 : Mr. Paul Teo
 1984-1985 : Mr. Ahmad Sabu
 1985-1986 : Mr. Ahmad Hamdan
 1987-1989 : Tuan Haji Mohd Zain Bin. Abang Ismail
 1990-1992 : Tuan Haji Morshidi Ali
 1992-1993 : Mr. Awang Bohli Awang Mohd Zain
 1994-1997 (June) : Mr. Wang Chang Chung
 1997 (June)-2003 : Tuan Haji Mohd Zain Bin. Abang Ismail
 2004-2006 : Ms. Jaidah Bte. Haji Alek
 2006-2007 (June) : Mrs. Faridah Abdullah
 2007-2008 (March): Mrs. Fiziah Abdullah (Acting Principal)
 2008-2012 : Tuan Haji Mohammad Syariff Affendy Bin. Matjeraie
 2012-2016  : Puan Hajah Saftuyah binti Haji Adenan
 2016 (December)  :  Puan Png Hellon (Acting Principal)
 2017(January–February) : Puan Png Hellon (Acting Principal)
 2017(March)-2021(October): Mr. Bahtiar Bin Afandi

School Magazine: Seri Lintang
Batu Lintang National Secondary School releases an annual school magazine titled Seri Lintang. The title is a mixture of two terms: Seri means 'beautiful' in Bahasa Melayu, whereas Lintang is derived from the second word of the school's name. Regular contents include the school's performance in PMR, SPM & STPM public examinations, school activities, teacher and staff photos, as well as student essay entries in multiple languages.

External links

See also 
 Education in Malaysia

References

National secondary schools in Malaysia
Secondary schools in Sarawak
Buildings and structures in Kuching
1977 establishments in Malaysia
Secondary schools in Malaysia